René of Chalon (5 February 1519 – 15 July 1544), also known as Renatus of Chalon, was a Prince of Orange and stadtholder of Holland, Zeeland, Utrecht and Gelre.

Life
René was born in Breda, the only son of Count Henry III of Nassau-Breda and Claudia of Chalon. Claudia's brother, Philibert of Chalon, was the last Prince of Orange from the House of Chalon. When Philibert died in 1530, René inherited the Princedom of Orange on condition that he used the name and coat of arms of the Chalon-Orange family. History knows him therefore as René of Chalon instead of as "René of Nassau-Breda".

René of Chalon married Anna of Lorraine (1522–1568) on 20 August 1540 at Bar-le-Duc. They had only one child, a daughter named Maria, who lived only 3 weeks and was buried in the Grote Kerk in Breda. He was made a knight of the Golden Fleece the same year.

Death
In 1544, René took part in the siege of St. Dizier in the service of Emperor Charles V. He was mortally wounded in battle and died with the Emperor attending at his bedside. René was buried in Grote Kerk in Breda, near the resting-place of his infant daughter. A commemorative monument (Cadaver Tomb of René of Chalon) stands in the church of St. Etienne in Bar-le-Duc.

Succession
René of Chalon had inherited the principality of Orange from his maternal uncle, who had been the last male member of the House of Chalon. Like his uncle, Rene also had no surviving children, and in his last will and testament, he left all his landed possessions, including the principality, to his father's brother's son, William of Nassau-Dillenburg. Thus, the estates belonging to Rene's mother's brother passed into the family of Rene's father's brother, and William the Silent came into possession of the principality despite having no connection at all to the original House of Orange. The only condition placed by Rene was that his heir, William, should receive a Catholic education. William's father (Rene's uncle) agreed on behalf of his minor son, and the succession was endorsed by the Emperor, who was the overlord of most of Rene's possessions. William the Silent duly added the name of Orange to his own paternal dignities and thus became, in 1544, the founder of the House of Orange-Nassau.

The principality of Orange had already passed, through the female line, from the first dynasty of Orange to the families Les Baux, and then to that of De Chalon. It now passed to a family which was not descended in blood at all from any of the preceding families.

Ancestors

References

Sources

|-

Princes of Orange
Lords of Breda
Dutch stadtholders
Military leaders of the Italian Wars
House of Nassau
Knights of the Golden Fleece
1519 births
1544 deaths
People from Breda
Modern child monarchs
Chalon-Arlay